Tazehnab-e Sofla (also Romanized as Tāzehnāb-e Soflá; also known as Tāzānaū, Tāzānū, Tazeh Nāb, Tāzeh Nāb-e Pā’īn, Tāzenāb, Taznāb, Tāznāb, Tāznāb-e Pā’īn, Tāznāb-e Soflá, and Tāznāb Tāf) is a village in Shaban Rural District, in the Central District of Nahavand County, Hamadan Province, Iran. At the 2006 census, its population was 122, in 33 families.

References 

Populated places in Nahavand County